Meyer Schleifer (February 9, 1908 – June 15, 1994) was an American bridge player from Los Angeles, California.

Schleifer was born in Brooklyn, New York City, one of five children born to Jewish emigrant parents Jacob Schleifer and Anna Frankel, born in Romania or the Russian Empire. He was a strong chess player as a teenager. He contracted tuberculosis as a law student at Columbia University, whence he quit school and moved to Denver for his health. He moved to Los Angeles a few years later, and won two Southern California Chess Championships before he switched to bridge. For most of his life, he earned a living at the bridge table, primarily by playing rubber bridge for money stakes at clubs. According to Eddie Kantar, who judged him "America's greatest bridge player" in 1972, Schleifer did have many clients at duplicate bridge, or tournament play, and could have become rich if he had not been a heavy loser betting on the horse races.

Schleifer was inducted into the ACBL Hall of Fame in 2000.

Bridge accomplishments

Honors

 ACBL Hall of Fame, 2000

Wins

 North American Bridge Championships (6)
 von Zedtwitz Life Master Pairs (1) 1966 
 Hilliard Mixed Pairs (1) 1947 
 Barclay Trophy (1) 1947 
 Mitchell Board-a-Match Teams (1) 1957 
 Reisinger (1) 1959 
 Spingold (1) 1953

Runners-up

 North American Bridge Championships

References

Further reading

 "Is this man America's greatest bridge player?", Eddie Kantar, Popular Bridge, December 1972.

External links
 
 
  – with photo portrait (WorldCat thumbnail image) of 6-man team, Los Angeles Bridge Club, 1960

1908 births
1994 deaths
American contract bridge players
People from Brooklyn
People from Los Angeles
20th-century American Jews
American people of Romanian-Jewish descent